Athithi may refer to

 Athidhi (2007 film), a 2007 Telugu film directed by Surender Reddy
 Athithi (2014 film), a Tamil film directed by Bharathan